Ede Komáromi (25 August 1928 – 31 January 2006) was a Hungarian basketball player who competed in the 1952 Summer Olympics. He was born in Szeged. He was part of the Hungarian basketball team, which was eliminated after the group stage of the 1952 tournament. He played four matches.

References

External links
 Mention of Ede Komáromi's death
 Ede Komáromi's profile at Eurobasket.com 

1928 births
2006 deaths
Hungarian men's basketball players
Olympic basketball players of Hungary
Basketball players at the 1952 Summer Olympics
Sportspeople from Szeged